The Nechako Reservoir, sometimes called the Ootsa Lake Reservoir, is a hydroelectric reservoir in British Columbia, Canada that was formed by the Kenney Dam making a diversion of the Nechako River through a 16-km intake tunnel in the Kitimat Ranges of the Coast Mountains to the 890 MW Kemano Generating Station at sea level at Kemano to service the then-new Alcan aluminum smelter at Kitimat. When it was constructed on the Nechako River in 1952, it resulted in the relocation of over 75 families. It was one of the biggest reservoirs built in Canada until the completion of the Columbia Treaty Dams and the W.A.C. Bennett Dam that created Lake Williston. The water level may swing 10 feet between 2790 and 2800 feet.

The damming "linked the rivers and lakes of Ootsa, Intata, Whitesail, Chelaslie, Tetachuck, Tahtsa and Natalkuz into the reservoir with a surface area of over 90,000 hectares." "The water of these lakes and rivers was diverted westward to the Pacific Ocean, instead of eastward to the Fraser River."

The creation of the reservoir flooded the series of lakes which typified the upper Nechako basin and in the process rendered the Quanchus Range, which lies between the north and south arms of the reservoir, a virtual island.  The names of lakes amalgamated into the reservoir are perpetuated as names for the various stretches of water.  The north arm includes Ootsa Lake, Whitesail Lake, and Whitesail Reach, the south arm Eutsuk Lake, Natalkuz Lake, Chedakuz Arm, Knewstubb Lake, Tetachuck Lake and others.  Because Ootsa Lake is the largest of the original lakes its name is sometimes used for the whole reservoir, though the official name remains Nechako Reservoir.

Tweedsmuir North Provincial Park and Protected Area and Entiako Provincial Park both border the reservoir.

Impact

Cheslatta Dakelh (Carrier)

For many generations, the shores of Ootsa Lake were home to the Cheslatta Carrier Nation. The flooding of Nechako Canyon destroyed their traditional hunting and fishing grounds and their homes.

Salvage archaeology
In the late 1940s, University of British Columbia professor Charles Edward Borden shifted his attention toward urgent salvage archaeology in the Nechako Canyon after learning that ALCAN planned on flooding the Nechako Canyon to supply power for their smelter in Kitimat (known as Kemano I Project). In 1951 Borden and his protégé, anthropology student, Wilson Duff located over 130 sites of importance to Cheslatta T'en history. They conducted more intensive investigations prior to the flooding of the area. The damming triggered "devastating changes for First Nations communities whose traditional territories lay in their path, including the destruction of Aboriginal gravesites, territories, livelihoods, and archaeological sites." In 1957, Alcan opened the gate of the spillway to Skin's Lake desecrating Cheslatta graves, which came to public attention during the Royal Commission on Aboriginal Peoples.

Kemano Completion Project
In the 1970s Alcan proposed expanding the generating capacity at their Kemano Powerhouse by diverting more water from the Nechako Reservoir.  No additional dams would be required and no additional flooding would take place.  However, the project was cancelled by the Provincial Government in 1995 on account of environmental concerns in the Nechako River.  A second power tunnel between the reservoir and the powerhouse, intended for use in the project, is scheduled to be completed in 2020 but will only serve as a backup to the original tunnel.

See also
List of tributaries of the Fraser River
Kenney Dam

Citations

References

 Detailed and illustrated Popular Science article on the Kemano Hydro Project.\

External links
 Detailed and illustrated Popular Science article on the Kemano Hydro Project

Reservoirs in British Columbia
Nechako Country
Range 4 Coast Land District